Alexey Vyacheslavovich Rubtsov (born 5 August 1988) is a Russian professional rock climber. He has participated in the bouldering competitions and won the world climbing championships in bouldering in 2009. He won the 9th edition of the Melloblocco competition in 2012. At the 2020 IFSC Climbing European Championships he won the combined event, ensuring him a place at the 2020 Summer Olympics.

He ranked third at the 2017 World Games in Wrocław, Poland in the men's boulder event.

Biography
In 2006 and 2007, Alexey Rubtsov started climbing in the Russian championships. In 2008, he entered two stages of the bouldering World Cup. In 2009, he participated in the bouldering World Championships again and won over Rustam Gelmanov and David Barrans. Over the next two years, he participated in several stages of the bouldering World Cup, finishing third in Sheffield and Munich in 2011.

In May 2012, he participated in the 9th edition of Melloblocco, a block outside competition, which takes place in Val Masino in Italy. Against 2200 other participants, he tied for the win with Michele Caminati and Anthony Gullsten. Shauna Coxsey won the women's competition that year.

Alexey Rubtsov opened and manages his own bouldering gym in the North of Moscow, called Tokio.

References

External links

 IFSC Profile
 8a.nu Profile
 

1988 births
Living people
Russian rock climbers
World Games bronze medalists
Competitors at the 2017 World Games
Sport climbers at the 2020 Summer Olympics
IFSC Climbing World Championships medalists
IFSC Climbing World Cup overall medalists
Boulder climbers